Ernest Smith (1912 – 30 January 1962) was an Irish boxer.  He attended Saint Columba's National School by North Strand Church. He competed in the men's featherweight event at the 1932 Summer Olympics.

References

External links
 

1912 births
1962 deaths
Irish male boxers
Olympic boxers of Ireland
Boxers at the 1932 Summer Olympics
Sportspeople from Dublin (city)
Featherweight boxers